Camp TUTO ("Thule Take-Off") was a major U.S. Army operated research camp at the foot of the Greenland ice cap,  east of Thule Air Base. It operated from 1954 to 1966, with revisits for follow-up research.

History
In the 1950s, Army research units became interested in building structures inside permanent ice for protection, survival, and concealment. Close to the Air Force's new base at Thule and within its associated joint Danish-American Defense Area, the Army Corps of Engineers was able to create an extensive infrastructure to try out these ideas.

Initially, from 1952, the Army Transportation Corps participated in cross-icecap supply trains using tracked vehicle convoys, eventually reaching as far as Station Nord on the east coast of Greenland. As the take-off point for the ice cap, the Army Corps of Engineers then built Camp Tuto for its Polar Research and Development Center (PRDC), and the site was used by the Snow, Ice and Permafrost Research Establishment (SIPRE) and its successor the Cold Regions Research and Engineering Laboratory (CRREL). Initially, the responsible agency was known as the 1st Engineer Arctic Task Force (EATF). In September 1958, during the build-up to ice camp construction, Camp Tuto was reportedly home to 450 military personnel, although some were there seasonally. Numerous specialized Army offices conducted research at Tuto. The camp left a sizable legacy in the scientific and technical literature.

Facilities
Major interior ice camp camps supported were Camp Century, located at about the 138 mile mark inland from Tuto, and Camp Fistclench at Mile 218, colocated with the Air Force's former advance radar station Site 2 (N-34). Along the flag-marked ice route, survival cabins with supply caches were set out at 30 mile intervals, also serving for weather, radio, and search-and-rescue tasks. Due to mapped crevasses, the ice cap route was far from a straight line.

This wide tunnel had temporary living accommodations, diesel generators, and basic comforts. The temperature inside was found to be . To considerable media attention, Camp Tuto Ice Tunnel was officially opened in October 1961.

At the eastern end of the airstrip, Camp Tuto proper had numerous large aluminum-sandwich buildings, some connected with innovative tunnels for weather protection. An ionosphere station was operational until 1966. Initially, the buildings had been Jamesway Huts, but over a hundred permanent structures were eventually built in a grid pattern. The egg-shaped corrugated steel tunnels for personnel access were used in places, probably as tests for Camp Fistclench. A mess hall, supply center, communications center, and a machine shop were on camp. Two doctors and a dentist served as a first medical line before the USAF base hospital.

Nearby satellite camps existed at various times. With a primary interest in engineering and construction, the Army units also assisted the Air Force in ice runway construction trials. Tuto was the transshipment camp for installation and removal of the PM-2A nuclear reactor at Camp Century.

Legacy
Although initially successful, the ice camps were subject to gradual deformation, compression, and subsidence requiring annual repair and realignment operations. Also, by 1966 the Army had different priorities, and Tuto was closed as a permanent camp. By the mid 1970s, activities were reduced to yearly visits for updates on ice deformation. Camp Tuto became a ghost town, although the airstrip, the ice ramp, and for some years also the ice tunnel remained usable. The ice ramp is still used for scientific access to the ice cap, including supply trains to mid-ice sites.

Another smaller camp to the north across Moltke Glacier, now inaccessible, was known as Camp NUTO. It was named for the Nunatarssuaq area, boxed in by two glaciers and the ice cap.

References
New York Times articles on Camp Tuto, 7, 8, and 15 October 1961.
Camp Century: City under the Ice. Walter Wager, Chilton, Philadelphia, 1962.
CRREL's First 25 Years: 1961–1986. Edmund Wright, US Army Cold Regions Research and Engineering Laboratory, June 1986.

Military installations of the United States in Greenland
Installations of the United States Army
Military installations established in 1954
Military installations closed in 1966
1954 establishments in Greenland